Funicin is an antibiotic witch is produced by the fungi Aspergillus funiculosus. Funicin has the molecular formula C17H18O5

References                                                      

Benzoate esters
Diphenyl ethers
Ethyl esters
Antibiotics